Mitre 10 is a major New Zealand chain of home improvement stores established in June 1974. It sells a range of household hardware, building supplies, heaters, air conditioners, garden products, barbeques and camping gear.

There were 84 Mitre 10 member stores around New Zealand, including 19 in Auckland. Together, the members employ more than 6000 staff.

The company has run many high-profile advertising campaigns in recent decades.

The brand is involved in many community projects, such as the Mitre 10 Takahe Rescue project, the New Zealander of the Year – Community of the year Award and the Neurological Foundation's Annual Appeal, as well as individual projects supported by stores to help their local communities - and has done very well in the Reader's Digest Trusted Brand survey.

History

The Mitre 10 brand and concept was born in Melbourne, Australia in 1959 as a local co-operative, with the initial 8 independent operators pooling their resources for shared advertising and promotions. Separate state-based companies were formed in the years following, and then an overall licensing company in 1964.

The concept appealed to New Zealand hardware shop owners, and on 28 June 1974 the New Zealand Herald reported "some of the smaller firms in the timber and hardware merchandising field are grouping together to present a unified buying and selling front." The first member's meeting in 1974 consisted of just twelve members representing fifteen stores.

The late 1980s saw the introduction of home centres, further refined with nationwide garden centres. In 1994 the "Mitre 10 Home and Trade" brand was established. A major move at the smaller end of the market was the addition of Hammer Hardware in 1994 - extending a presence to the majority of towns in New Zealand. At the large end of the scale, in 2003 Mitre 10 Mega was added.

There were 50 Mitre 10 stores in 1999.

There were 113 Mitre 10 stores in 2003.

In 2010 Mitre 10 (New Zealand) Limited took full ownership of the Mitre 10 brands for New Zealand after changes to the ownership of the, quite separate, Mitre 10 operation in Australia.

There were 83 Mitre 10 stores in 2019.

MEGA Stores

Mitre 10 Mega is a chain of big-box stores, designed as a one-stop shop for major projects. It directly competes with such chains as Bunnings and The Warehouse. Mega stores offer customers a larger product range than standard Mitre 10 stores including larger garden centres and drive-through facilities, as well as extra services such as cafes and children's play areas.

The first Mega store opened in Hastings Central in 2004. By 2008, there were 15 Mitre 10 Mega stores.

"Easy As" campaign
In 2012, Mitre 10 launched an integrated television commercial, online and in-store promotion programme designed to foster Kiwis enthusiasm for DIY with a series of "How To" DIY film segments fronted by Mitre 10's Stan Scott, a registered builder with more than 26 years of building experience.

Rugby sponsorship
In December 2015, Mitre 10 was announced as the new sponsor of all of New Zealand's major domestic rugby union competitions effective with the 2016 season—the top-level men's competition, formerly known as the ITM Cup; the second-level men's Heartland Championship, most recently sponsored by Pink Batts; the Women's Provincial Championship; and the Jock Hobbs Memorial National U19 tournament. The deal ran through to the 2020 season and was not renewed.

References

External links 
 Mitre 10 New Zealand

Home improvement companies of New Zealand
Retail companies established in 1974
1974 establishments in New Zealand